Arun Sao is an Indian politician. He was elected to the 17th Lok Sabha, lower house of the Parliament of India from Bilaspur, Chhattisgarh in the 2019 Indian general election. He is the President of Bharatiya Janata Party, Chhattisgarh unit.

References

External links
 Official biographical sketch in Parliament of India website

India MPs 2019–present
Lok Sabha members from Chhattisgarh
Living people
Bharatiya Janata Party politicians from Chhattisgarh
1968 births